Mr. Bartley's Burger Cottage is a restaurant with a menu primarily of hamburgers on the edge of Harvard Yard in Cambridge, Massachusetts. Opened in 1960, Bill Bartley put it up for sale in 2020 so he could retire. Their landlord is Harvard University and rent negotiations in 2019 were so difficult that they might have had to change their location. Known for the creative names for their hamburgers, they temporarily named one "Greedy Landlords". Bartley said "he's only interested in a buyer who will keep the restaurant as it is".

They have appeared on Food Paradise (season 17) and Chowdown Countdown.  They also appeared in the movie The Social Network.

History
Joan and Joe Bartley took over the Harvard Spa space in 1960.  Customers have included Julian Edelman, Jacqueline Kennedy Onassis, Bob Dylan, Katie Couric and Al Pacino.

Legal issues
In February 2019, the restaurant and their landlord Harvard University were sued by Andres Melo, who uses a wheelchair, for violating the Americans with Disabilities Act of 1990 since he was unable to enter the restaurant with his wheelchair. Melo filed a notice of settlement on August 9 amd the judge dismissed the case.

References

External links
The Neighborhood Where Nothing Ever Changes

Hamburger restaurants in the United States
Restaurants in Cambridge, Massachusetts
Harvard Square